Liberty is an unincorporated community in Highland County, Virginia, United States. The community is located in the Cowpasture River valley at the confluence of the Cowpasture River and Shaws Fork.

References

Unincorporated communities in Highland County, Virginia
Unincorporated communities in Virginia